The DFB Sports Court (German: DFB-Sportgericht) is a regulatory body in the German Football Association (DFB) and may adopt different sanctions on clubs and players.

History
Together with the Bundesliga, the DFB Sports Court was founded in 1963. It hears cases of misconduct by individual players, clubs or spectators. The court is a separate authority, responsible for the national and regional leagues. The judges and staff are volunteers.

Structure
The structure resembles that of a normal court. The court is composed of a chief judge, a deputy and 28 assessors. The chief judge and the deputy are elected by the DFB-Bundestag. Chief judge is Hans Eberhard Lorenz.

Proceedings
The DFB Sports Court convenes when serious rule violations occur. This starts directly after a red card is given. The court determines the sentence depending on the hardness of the fouls or unsportsmanlike conduct. If the clubs in question agree, the sports court creates a written statement. Only 20% of procedures end with a hearing.

Appeals against decisions from the DFB Sports Court can be presented to the DFB Federal Court.

Important decisions
 2011–12 Bundesliga's relegation play-offs

See also
Court of Arbitration for Sport

References

External links
 DFB-Sportgericht 

Courts in Germany
Football in Germany
1963 establishments in Germany
Frankfurt
Sports law
Courts and tribunals established in 1963